Old Mother Riley's Circus is a 1941 British comedy film directed by Thomas Bentley and starring Arthur Lucan, Kitty McShane and John Longden. Old Mother Riley takes over a struggling circus and makes a huge success of it. The trade ad poster proclaims, "A LAUGH - A YELL - A ROAR - A LUCANQUAKE!"  The film was made at the Rock Studios in Elstree by British National Films. It was the final film by Bentley, who had been a leading British director during the silent era and early sound era.

Plot summary
Old Mother Riley is the ringmaster after taking over a big top with flagging fortunes. Although the circus is plagued by the disappearance of its owner, and the bailiffs are at the door, the show somehow manages to go on. Money starts to pour in, financial disaster is avoided, and Mother Riley discovers her long-lost daughter is in fact the star of the show.

Cast
 Arthur Lucan as Mrs. Riley
 Kitty McShane as Kitty Riley
 John Longden as Bill
 Edgar Driver as Bobo the Clown
 Beckett Bould as Davis
 Roy Emerton as Santley, circus owner
 O. B. Clarence as Lawyer
 Syd Crossley as The Bailiff
 Hector Abbas as Wizista, the hypnotist
 W. T. Holland as Character
 John Turnbull as Cinema Manager
 Iris Vandeleur as Landlady
 Ben Williams as Lucky
 Nora Gordon as 1st Charwoman
 Jennie Gregson as 2nd Charwoman

Critical reception
TV Guide said, "the usual padding that plagues the "Old Mother Riley" series is avoided thanks to a jolly atmosphere and some decent acts."

References

External links

1941 films
British comedy films
1941 comedy films
1940s English-language films
Films directed by Thomas Bentley
Films set in England
Films shot at British National Studios
British black-and-white films
1940s British films